Justine Caldwell is an American politician and is a Democratic member of the Rhode Island House of Representatives, representing District 30 (East Greenwich, Rhode Island and West Greenwich, Rhode Island).

Education
Caldwell attended and earned a bachelor's and master's degrees from the University of Rhode Island. Caldwell received a PhD in American studies from Bowling Green University.

Election history

References

External links
Official page at the Rhode Island General Assembly
Justin Caldwell at Ballotpedia
Campaign Page
VoteSmart

Place of birth missing (living people)
Living people
Year of birth missing (living people)
Democratic Party members of the Rhode Island House of Representatives
People from East Greenwich, Rhode Island
21st-century American politicians